Maharaja Sir Umed Singh II  (15 September 1873 – 27 December 1940) was a ruling Maharaja of Kotah from 1889 to 1940.

Although never appointed to any official post within the British Raj, Sir Umed served as an advisor to leading government officials, and was much sought after for his advice. He sent his troops to fight in both the First World War and the Second World War.

Life
The great-great-great-great-great-grandson of Kishore Singh, a Raja of Kota, Sir Umed Singhji was adopted at a young age by Shatru Pal the then Maharaja of the state. Following his death in 1889, Umed Singhji (Udai Singh, as he was then named) embarked on a long and distinguished career as a soldier and statesman, being educated at Mayo College in Ajmer.

He received the honorary rank of Major in the Army in the 1903 Durbar Honours on 1 January 1903.

He died in 1940, aged 67, after a reign of 52 years, and was succeeded by his son, Bhim Singhji II.

Titles
1873–1889: Kunwar Sri Umaid Singh
1889–1900: His Highness Maharajadhiraj Maharaja Mahimahendra Maharao Raja Shri Umed Singh II Sahib Bahadur, Maharao Raja of Kotah
1900–1903: His Highness Maharajadhiraj Maharaja Mahimahendra Maharao Raja Shri Sir Umed Singh II Sahib Bahadur, Maharao Raja of Kotah, KCSI
1903–1907: Major His Highness Maharajadhiraj Maharaja Mahimahendra Maharao Raja Shri Sir Umed Singh II Sahib Bahadur, Maharao Raja of Kotah, KCSI
1907–1911: Major His Highness Maharajadhiraj Maharaja Mahimahendra Maharao Raja Shri Sir Umed Singh II Sahib Bahadur, Maharao Raja of Kotah, GCIE, KCSI
1911–1915: Major His Highness Maharajadhiraj Maharaja Mahimahendra Maharao Raja Shri Sir Umed Singh II Sahib Bahadur, Maharao Raja of Kotah, GCSI, GCIE
1915–1918: Lieutenant-Colonel His Highness Maharajadhiraj Maharaja Mahimahendra Maharao Raja Shri Sir Umed Singh II Sahib Bahadur, Maharao Raja of Kotah, GCSI, GCIE
1918–1939: Lieutenant-Colonel His Highness Maharajadhiraj Maharaja Mahimahendra Maharao Raja Shri Sir Umed Singh II Sahib Bahadur, Maharao Raja of Kotah, GCSI, GCIE, GBE
1939–1940: Colonel His Highness Maharajadhiraj Maharaja Mahimahendra Maharao Raja Shri Sir Umed Singh II Sahib Bahadur, Maharao Raja of Kotah, GCSI, GCIE, GBE

Honours
Delhi Durbar Gold Medal, 1903
Knight Grand Commander of the Order of the Indian Empire (GCIE), 1907
Delhi Durbar Gold Medal, 1911
Knight Grand Commander of the Order of the Star of India (GCSI, 1911) (KCSI, 1900)
Knight Grand Cross of the Order of the British Empire (GBE), 1918
King George V Silver Jubilee Medal, 1935
King George VI Coronation Medal, 1937

Legacy
Rolls-Royce
In 2011, his 1925 Phantom I Rolls-Royce, customised with mounted guns and searchlights for tiger hunting, came up for auction in the US. The auto is expected to sell for up to $1.6 million.

External links

Knights Grand Commander of the Order of the Star of India
Knights Grand Commander of the Order of the Indian Empire
Indian Knights Grand Cross of the Order of the British Empire
1873 births
1940 deaths
People from Kota, Rajasthan
History of Kota, Rajasthan
Maharajas of Rajasthan